Damon Keane Washington (born February 20, 1977) is a former American football running back in the National Football League. He played for the New York Giants. He played college football for the Colorado State Rams. He was inducted into the Colorado State University Athletics Hall of Fame in 2012.

References

1977 births
Living people
American football running backs
New York Giants players
Colorado State Rams football players
People from Lockney, Texas
Players of American football from Texas